Ken Siaosi Pisi (born 24 February 1989 in Apia, Samoa) is a former rugby union player for Northampton Saints in the Aviva Premiership and the Samoa national rugby union team.

Both his brothers, Tusi Pisi and George Pisi, also are professional rugby players and went to Massey High School and played for North Harbour and in 2012 Ken joined George at Northampton Saints.

While with Saints, Pisi has played in the 2014 European Rugby Challenge Cup Final where the Northampton side lifted the trophy after beating Bath Rugby 30-16 at Cardiff Arms Park. He also started as Northampton beat Saracens to win the Premiership.

Previously a part of the Samoa Sevens Squad, Pisi made his Samoa senior debut in 2012 as the country faced Tonga and has since racked up a number of appearances for his country including representing Samoa at the 2015 Rugby World Cup.

Most recently, Pisi has been called up to the Samoa squad for the 2017 summer internationals alongside fellow Northampton Saints back Ahsee Tuala.

References

External links
 

1989 births
Living people
Samoan rugby union players
Sportspeople from Apia
Samoan expatriate sportspeople in the United Kingdom
North Harbour rugby union players
Northampton Saints players
Rugby union wings
Samoa international rugby union players